John Edwin Baker (July 18, 1899 – March 6, 1963) was an American politician in the state of Florida and a Democrat.

Baker was born in Plant City, Florida, the son of George Bell and Julia P. (McLendon) Baker. He was educated in Palm Beach County, Florida and was a businessman, realtor, and general manager of the Palm Beach Times newspaper. Baker also served in World War I with the United States Navy. He was married and has two children. He served in the Florida State Senate from 1949 to 1955 and also briefly in 1943, for the 23rd district.

References

1899 births
1963 deaths
People from Plant City, Florida
Businesspeople from Florida
Editors of Florida newspapers
Democratic Party Florida state senators
People from Eustis, Florida
Pork Chop Gang
20th-century American politicians
20th-century American businesspeople